Ceelys on the James was a plantation on the James River in Virginia, built in 1706 by Colonel William Wilson.

Wilson's daughter, Mary, married Colonel Miles Cary, Jr. of Richneck Plantation. Sally Cary, who married George William Fairfax, and Sarah Cary, who married Bryan Fairfax were born there.

Located 3 or 4 miles from Hampton, it was destroyed during the Civil War.

See also
Historic houses in Virginia
James River Plantations 
Newport News, Virginia
List of former United States counties

References 

Pre-statehood history of Virginia
Landmarks in Virginia
James River plantations
History of Newport News, Virginia
Houses completed in 1706
Cary family of Virginia
1706 establishments in Virginia